Väinö Johannes Rankila (19 July 1911 in Vimpeli – 27 November 1970) was a Finnish farmer and politician. He was a member of the Parliament of Finland from 1948 to 1958, representing the Agrarian League.

References

1911 births
1970 deaths
People from Vimpeli
People from Vaasa Province (Grand Duchy of Finland)
Centre Party (Finland) politicians
Members of the Parliament of Finland (1948–51)
Members of the Parliament of Finland (1951–54)
Members of the Parliament of Finland (1954–58)